Mazsalaca Manor, also called Valtenberga or Valtenberģi Manor, is a manor house in the historical region of Vidzeme, in northern Latvia. It was built before 1780 in German Classical style. Severely damaged by fire in 1905, the mansard roof was repaired in 1911 to preserve the remaining structure. Restoration was finally completed after 1925, and the building has housed the Mazsalaca secondary school ever since.

See also
List of palaces and manor houses in Latvia

References

External links
  Valtenberģi Manor
 

Mazsalaca
Manor houses in Latvia